Petra Melka (born 3 December 1951) is a German footballer. She played in two matches for the Germany women's national football team in 1984.

References

External links
 

1951 births
Living people
German women's footballers
Germany women's international footballers
Place of birth missing (living people)
Women's association footballers not categorized by position